is a Japanese variety show, broadcast since 2005 on TV Tokyo. In 2013, Toho produced a film based on the show, Goddotan kiss patience Championship - The Movie, directed by Nobuyuki Sakuma.  It debuted at number 15 on the Japanese box office chart.

References

External links
 Goddotan at TV Tokyo

TV Tokyo original programming
Japanese variety television shows
2005 Japanese television series debuts
Japanese comedy television series